Novaya Aldashla (Yañı Ältäşle) is a rural locality (a village) in Tashlinsky Selsoviet, Gafuriysky District, Bashkortostan, Russia. The population was 3 as of 2010. There are 2 streets.

Geography 
Novaya Aldashla is located 21 km northeast of Krasnousolsky (the district's administrative centre) by road. Novosemyonovka is the nearest rural locality.

References 

Rural localities in Gafuriysky District